George Ward Hunt (30 July 1825 – 29 July 1877) was a British statesman of the Conservative Party who was Chancellor of the Exchequer and First Lord of the Admiralty in the first and second ministries of Benjamin Disraeli.

Early life
He was born at Buckhurst in Berkshire, the eldest son of the Rev. George Hunt of Winkfield, and his wife Emma Gardiner, daughter of Samuel Gardiner of Coombe Lodge, Oxfordshire. His father was rector of Barningham and then Boughton. He was educated at Eton College. He matriculated at Christ Church, Oxford in 1844. As an undergraduate, he went on vacation reading parties with Arthur Hugh Clough: in 1845 at Grasmere, in 1846 at Castleton of Braemar and in 1847 at Drumnadrochit on Loch Ness. In Clough's poem The Bothie of Toper-na-fuosich, he is identified with the outsize character Hobbes. Hobbes dances in a kilt, and Hunt painted a self-portrait of himself wearing one.

Hunt graduated B.A. in 1848, and M.A. in 1851; on 21 November of that year he was called to the bar at the Inner Temple.

Political career
Hunt entered the House of Commons in 1857 as Member of Parliament for Northamptonshire North, at the end of the year, having made several unsuccessful attempts previously. He was a Secretary to the Treasury from 1866 to 1868, in the ministry of the 14th Earl of Derby. Regarded as "sensible but dull", according to Derby's biographer Hawkins, he was then appointed to the Exchequer when Disraeli took office.

There is a Westminster tradition that, on leaving Downing Street for the House of Commons on Budget Day, the Chancellor of the Exchequer shows the assembled crowd the ministerial red box containing the Budget speech, by holding it aloft. When Hunt presented his one and only Budget speech, he kept the House of Commons waiting, and it is supposed that he had left the speech behind. When he spoke, the Budget presentation was the shortest recorded.

Hunt was appointed to the Admiralty for Disraeli's second ministry, serving from 1874 until his death from gout in 1877. Although he was considered competent at finance, his turn at the Admiralty was, for a long time, not much admired. That attitude has, however, been revised. Canada's Ward Hunt Island was named for him. It is off Ellesmere Island, and of interest for the Ward Hunt Ice Shelf observed in 1876 by Pelham Aldrich.

Hunt died at Bad Homburg, Germany, in July 1877, on the eve of his 52nd birthday. His wife died in 1894.

Family
Hunt married Alice, daughter of the Right Reverend Robert Eden, Bishop of Moray, Ross and Caithness, in 1857. They had five sons and five daughters, including Sir Allen Thomas Hunt, an Admiral in the Royal Navy.

Hunt's residence was Wadenhoe House in Northamptonshire.

Notes

References

External links 

 

1825 births
1877 deaths
Alumni of Christ Church, Oxford
Chancellors of the Exchequer of the United Kingdom
Conservative Party (UK) MPs for English constituencies
First Lords of the Admiralty
Members of the Inner Temple
Members of the Privy Council of the United Kingdom
UK MPs 1857–1859
UK MPs 1859–1865
UK MPs 1865–1868
UK MPs 1868–1874
UK MPs 1874–1880
Presidents of the Oxford Union